Bilton Musonda (born 9 April 1971) is a Zambian footballer. He played in six matches for the Zambia national football team in 1995 and 1996. He was also named in Zambia's squad for the 1996 African Cup of Nations tournament.

References

1971 births
Living people
Zambian footballers
Zambia international footballers
1996 African Cup of Nations players
Place of birth missing (living people)
Association football midfielders